Sahar may refer to:

People
 Sahar (name), Arabic feminine name or Hebrew unisex name
 Sahar (singer), Iranian singer, musician and dancer.
 Sahar Aslam, former Scottish international cricketer.
 Sahar Ansari, Urdu poet and linguist from Karachi Pakistan.
 Sahar Baassiri, Ambassador, Permanent Representative of Lebanon to UNESCO in Paris.
 Sahar Biniaz, Canadian actress, model and beauty queen.
 Ben Sahar, Israeli footballer

Places
 Sahar, Bihar, town and block in Bhojpur district, Bihar
Sahar Village, Mumbai
 Sahar, another name for Chhatrapati Shivaji International Airport 
Sahar Elevated Access Road, a road in India

See also
Sahara (disambiguation)